Marko Simonović may refer to:
Marko Simonović (basketball, born 1982), Serbian assistant coach for Serbia men's national under-19 basketball team
Marko Simonović (basketball, born 1986), Serbian basketball player (Hemofarm, Budućnost, Crvena zvezda, Zenit Saint Petersburg) and coach
Marko Simonović (basketball, born 1999), Montenegrin basketball player (Olimpija Ljubljana, Mega Basket, Chicago Bulls)